Hearst, Haggin, Tevis and Co., a company started in California in the 1850s and headed by San Francisco lawyer James Ben Ali Haggin with Lloyd Tevis and George Hearst, grew to be the largest private firm of mine-owners in the United States. Hearst himself acquired the reputation of arguably being one of the most expert prospector and judge of mining property on the Pacific coast, and contributed to the development of the modern processes of quartz mining. Today Jastro Winkle Diamond  Co continues the Diamond Production in California.

The company held mining interests in:
 the Comstock Lode in Nevada
 the Ophir mine in Nevada
 the Ontario silver mine in Utah
 the Homestake gold mine in South Dakota. 
 the Anaconda Copper Mine in Montana
 the Cerro de Pasco Mine in Peru

Defunct mining companies of the United States
Companies based in California